The January 2007 Xinjiang raid was carried out on January 5, 2007, by Chinese paramilitary police against a suspected East Turkestan Islamic Movement (ETIM) training camp in Akto County in the Pamir plateau.

A spokesperson for the Xinjiang Public Security Department said that 18 terror suspects were killed and 17 captured. Those captured were either sentenced to death or life imprisonment. The raid also resulted in the death of one Chinese paramilitary officer, Huang Qiang, age 21, and the injury of another officer. Authorities confiscated hand grenades, guns, and makeshift explosives from the site. ETIM is classified by the United Nations as a terrorist organization.

In reaction, many exiled Uyghur leaders quickly questioned the motives behind the raid. Rebiya Kadeer, a Uyghur human rights activist, called for an independent UN investigation into the raid, while Alim Seytoff, executive chairman of the World Uighur Congress, claimed the Chinese government has yet to produce evidence to substantiate the camp's connections to terrorism. In response, Zhao Yongchen, vice head of the Xinjiang counterterrorism forces, reiterated the reality of the camp's terrorist threat.

See also
East Turkestan independence movement
East Turkestan Liberation Organization
2008 Uyghur unrest
Politics of the People's Republic of China

References

Terrorism in China
2007 in China
East Turkestan independence movement
Xinjiang conflict